Rage rap (also called as rage-rap, rage beats or simply rage,) is an energetic microgenre of trap music. Distinguishing features of rage rap include short repeating stereo-widened EDM-influenced and future bass-influenced looped synthesizer lead hooks and a basic trap rhythm. Among the pioneers of rage rap are rappers Lil Uzi Vert, Playboi Carti, Trippie Redd, and Yeat, although the subgenre is primarily centered around its production style, which has been defined by producers like LOESOE and Star Boy.

Etymology
The name of the subgenre comes mainly from "Miss The Rage" track made in 2021 by Trippie Redd and Playboi Carti, whose name references moshpits during rap concerts that Trippie Redd longed for during COVID-19 lockdowns.

In the context of the title, "rage" means "moshpit". The concept of "rages" at rap concerts and the use of the term "rage" in hip hop music predate the rage subgenre itself: the first person to use the term "rage" in context of hip-hop is said to be Kid Cudi, with his "Mr.Rager" alter-ego, which influenced Travis Scott who later adopted "rage" word and made it an important part of his own aesthetic. During the 2010s, multiple artists and critics used the word "rage" in context of hip-hop, mostly either referring to overdriven energetic sound, or the moshpits happening at rap concerts, examples being Lil Uzi Vert's Luv Is Rage and Luv Is Rage 2 releases, and multiple sources calling 6ix9ine's and XXXTENTACION's music "rage rap". For this reason, both Lil Uzi Vert and Travis Scott have been repeatedly referred to by such descriptive terms as "rage rapper" or "rage rap pioneer", or "king of rage rap", although it has also been suggested that both Lil Uzi Vert and the sound of Astroworld album actually influenced the rage rap subgenre, particularly Yeat's music. Lil Uzi Vert has also been important influence to Trippie Redd during his work on Trip At Knight, and to SoFaygo, Travis Scott's Cactus Jack Records signee and the author of early noted rage track "Off The Map".

History
Among the immediate precursors of rage are beats made by Mike Will Made-It, beats made by Dun Deal and C4 for 1017 Thug by Young Thug and beats by Metro Boomin and Southside from the mid-2010s. Abo Kado, an author for Mikiki music reviewing website, suggested that rage beats primarily evolved from production style of Pierre Bourne, Maaly Raw and F1lthy, all of whom relied heavily on trap music and synthesizer melodies in their beats, had strong video game music influence and also worked closely with Playboi Carti and Lil Uzi Vert. The production styles of Pierre Bourne and music of Lil Uzi Vert were, in turn, influenced by music of Wiz Khalifa and his producer Sledgren, who sometimes incorporated videogame samples in their music and were, in turn, influenced by early attempts to fuse European synthesizer-based music with hip-hop and contemporary R&B during the 2000s by Polow Da Don and others.

Playboi Carti has been often suggested as either an originator or primary popularizer of rage rap, laying the foundation of genre during his work on Die Lit album in 2018, mostly produced by Pierre Bourne. It's also often suggested that the foundation of rage has been laid with Playboi Carti's Whole Lotta Red album, released in late 2020 and mostly produced by F1lthy. Despite its initial mixed reception by fans, this album would come to largely define the genre, with much of what came after either heavily influenced by or trying to directly replicate the album's style.

The genre's popularity breakthrough is also attributed to the "Miss The Rage" by Trippie Redd and featuring Playboi Carti, which was recorded in the early 2021. Along with "Whole Lotta Red", "Miss The Rage" was influential in the rage subgenre, with multiple producers and rappers adopting the style after the single was released. Rapper Mario Judah went on to release his re-produced version of "Miss The Rage", since the main loop for the instrumental of "Miss The Rage" was based on a royalty-free melody loop. Trippie Redd later went to on to solidify popularity of "Miss The Rage" and recorded a primarily rage album called Trip At Knight and expressed his fascination with rage rap. Popular rapper Drake, who's tactic is often to showcase little known subgenres and styles in his albums, has also made a rage-influenced track in March 2021, called "What's Next", a part of his Scary Hours 2 EP. The beat from "What's Next", produced by Maneesh and Supah Mario, has been repeatedly likened to tracks from "Whole Lotta Red". "What's Next" reached top position on Billboard Hot 100 chart.

Playboi Carti's record label Opium has been an influential force in the genre, with influential artists in the genre such as Ken Carson, Destroy Lonely, & Homixide Gang signed to the label in addition to Carti himself. The label has had several notable rage releases, suuch Ken Carson's 2021 album Project X and Destroy Lonely's 2022 album No Stylists have had commercial success and a positive reception from fans, as they continue to push the genre to the mainstream.

SoFaygo is another early adopter of rage sound. His late 2020 single "Off The Map", which somewhat predates the rage subgenre hype, has also be described as either closely resembling rage rap or being an outright rage song. After releasing "Off The Map", SoFaygo went to collaborate with Trippie Red on "MP5" rage track from Trip At Knight and with Lil Yachty on "Solid" rage track.

Later in 2021, thanks to TikTok, underground rapper Yeat started releasing a more chaotic and dark version of rage rap, noted for abundant use of bell samples, after his multiple songs ("Sorry About That" and "Mad About That" among them) became popular on the platform. After becoming popular on TikTok, Yeat's music was noticed by the likes of Lil Yachty and Drake. After that, Yeat went on to release two rage albums in 2021 and 2022, titled Up 2 Me and 2 Alive, showcasing his signature darker rage sound.

Although rage has been referred to as formulaic and was deemed a "probable dead-end subgenre" and a "formulaic" subgenre by some critics, a pleiad of lesser-known rappers emerged, using rage in their music, sometimes in experimental fashion, among them artists like SSGKobe, Ken Carson, TyFontaine, $NOT, Cochise, KayCyy, Ka$hdami, and others. KayCyy performed his rage-influenced "OKAY" single to a mere chiptune-influenced synth loop, disregarding trap beat altogether. Matt Ox, an experimental rapper, has also been described as a "rager" for releasing rage tracks such as "Live It Up". Rapper KanKan's RR album from the late 2021 has been described as heavily influenced by rage sound, as has been 2022 releases, such Carnival by Caal Vo, Muddyworld V2 by Muddymya, and others. Yung Kayo, Young Thug's protege, was noted for mixing rage with hyperpop and pluggnb, along with other influences, on his 2022 DFTK album.

In mid-2022, Yeat has released "Rich Minion", a rage track that became a soundtrack to an official trailer for Minions: The Rise of Gru kids movie. "Rich Minions" went viral and became a meme on TikTok, helping to solidify the genre's popularity.

In Januray 2023 YoungBoy Never Broke Again would release his fifth studio album I Rest My Case featuring rage beats.

Rage has also made its way to Europe. Lancey Foux, a British rapper partly influenced by Playboi Carti, has released LIVE.EVIL album in late 2021, which contained rage elements mixed with UK hip hop. Foux' earlier mixtape, FIRST DEGREE, was also described as containing rage elements. Foux also later went on to collaborate with Yeat on a "Luv Money" track from 2 Alive deluxe edition. In Germany, rage tracks were recorded by rappers such as Peshanim, Skrt Cobain (with his track "Neue Whip"), Okfella, Dante YN, and others.

Characteristics
Rage sound has been overall characterized as futuristic, electric and synth-driven. Vivian Medithi of HipHopDx described rage as a sound rooting in plugg music legacy with more electronic influences. Tom Breihan of Stereogum described rage beats as glitchy and as "a cheap, functional type of beat — the type of beat that seems to spring almost entirely from the "type beats" that have proliferated on YouTube in the past few years — but its cheapness is disorienting and sometimes even psychedelic". Rage is mainly characterized by the use stereo-widened EDM-influenced lead synthesizer patches, reminiscent of the 1980s and 1990s game soundtracks and of trance music, used to play short, often emotional, melodies arranged in short loops which repeat throughout the song, and a basic, "dull", trap beat, accompanying these melodies, with bouncy, often overdriven, heavy and elastic 808s bass notes. These synth hooks play such a role in rage that the whole sound has been described as a "hybrid genre of trap music and EDM". Synth leads have said to be influenced by a number of EDM and electronic musicians, such as The Chainsmokers, Skrillex, Diplo, Zedd, Rustie and others. It has also been noticed, that oftentimes EDM synth hooks in rage come from pre-packaged EDM melody packs, for instance, a guitar-driven "" EDM loop from "Miss The Rage" came from the royalty-free EDM sample pack by Cymatics, called Cymatics Odyssey EDM Sample Pack. Yeat has also made it popular to use chiming bell sounds, once popular in earlier trap and drill music, in rage beats.

In terms of vocal delivery, many rappers in rage style oftentimes imitate vocal styles of Playboi Carti, although the subgenre is mainly centered around beat production style.

External links
Rage rap subgenre at rateyourmusic.com

References

Music genres
Hip hop genres